Epidermolytic acanthomas are a cutaneous condition characterized by discrete keratotic papules in adults.

See also 
 Dermatosis papulosa nigra
 List of cutaneous conditions

References 

Epidermal nevi, neoplasms, and cysts